Jon Carlton Gustin (May 7, 1932 – April 9, 1994) was an American professional golfer.

Gustin was born in Kentucky and grew up in Birmingham, Alabama.

Gustin worked primarily as a club pro but played on the PGA Tour from 1956 to 1965. His best finish was a T-2 at the 1960 Cajun Classic Open Invitational. His best finish in a major was a T-9 at the 1964 PGA Championship.

Professional wins
Alabama Open (five times)

References

American male golfers
PGA Tour golfers
Golfers from Kentucky
Golfers from Birmingham, Alabama
1932 births
1994 deaths